The Blue Guitar is a 1977 suite of twenty etchings with aquatint by David Hockney.

The Blue Guitar or Blue Guitar may also refer to:

Music 

 "Blue Guitar", a 1963 song written by Burt Bacharach and Hal David
 "Blue Guitar" (Justin Hayward and John Lodge song), from the 1975 album Blue Jays
 "Blue Guitar" (Celeste Buckingham song), 2011

Poetry 

 The Man with the Blue Guitar, a 1937 poem by Wallace Stevens

See also 

 The Old Guitarist, a 1903–1904 oil painting by Pablo Picasso, during his Blue Period
 Blue Guitars, a 2005 album by Chris Rea
 Blue Guitars (Stephen Bishop album), 1996
 The Blue Guitar Sessions (Jesse Cook album), 2012